Josephine Morello, Ph.D., an American microbiologist,  is the founder  and first editor-in-chief  of  the American Society for Microbiology's  Clinical Microbiology Reviews. She is also a founding co-editor of the Clinical Microbiology Newsletter.

Her expertise is in the area of clinical microbiology. Besides her numerous publications in the field, one of her major achievements was her work on automation in the clinical microbiology laboratory. Because of this, automation is now the standard in clinical microbiology labs.

Biography 
In 1969, she was the first woman to earn certification by the American Board of Medical Microbiology. Prior to her long career at the University of Chicago Hospitals, she was an assistant professor of microbiology at the College of Physicians and Surgeons at Columbia University. She retired from her positions of hospital laboratories director and Department of Pathology vice chair at the University of Chicago in 2001.

Honors 
 Fellow, American Academy of Microbiology (1973 to present), 
 Board member of the American Board of Medical Microbiology Standard and Examination Committee, 
 ASM's first Distinguished Service Award and Professional Recognition Award, American Board of Medical Microbiology, 
 Pasteur award for the Illinois Society of Microbiology in 1988,

References

External links 
 www.example.com

American microbiologists
Women microbiologists
University of Chicago faculty
Living people
Year of birth missing (living people)